Front Page Sports: Ski Racing is a 1997 video game from Dynamix.

Gameplay
The player is treated to videos of Picabo Street explaining the best and easiest way to make it down the hill alive.

The player is given choices of five different kinds of racing: Slalom, Giant Slalom, Super-G, Downhill and All-Around. In these the player can control the difficulty of the courses by changing the weather and the snow conditions. In addition there are six choices of courses to ski on: Whistler, Aspen Mountain, Vail, Mt. Bachelor, Val d'lsere and Garmisch.

Reception

Computer Gaming World gave the game a score of 2 out of 5 stating"Maybe if Papyrus had developed the game instead of Dynamix it would have been more realistic. As it is, it’s a moderately fun arcade racing game. Just don’t try the slalom"

References

1997 video games
Windows games
Dynamix games
Windows-only games
Sierra Entertainment games